Meram is a town and district of Konya Province in the Central Anatolia region of Turkey. Meram is one of the central districts of Konya along with the districts of Karatay and Selçuklu. According to 2000 census, population of the district is 267,878 of which 231,386 live in the urban center of Meram.

Sister cities
Meram is twinned with:
 Akjoujt, Inchiri Region, Mauritania

Notable residents
Ali Kireş (born 1991), footballer

Notes

References

External links

 District governor's official website 
 District municipality's official website 

Populated places in Konya Province
Districts of Konya Province
Lycaonia